The Buffalo is a wheeled mine resistant ambush protected (MRAP) armored military vehicle built by Force Protection, Inc., a division of General Dynamics. It is the largest vehicle in Force Protection's line-up, followed by the Cougar MRAP and the Ocelot light protected patrol vehicle (LPPV).

History
The Buffalo vehicle was designed based on the successful South African Casspir mine-protected vehicle.  The Casspir is a four-wheeled vehicle, while the Buffalo has six wheels.  Buffalo is also fitted with a large articulated arm, used for ordnance disposal. Both vehicles incorporate a "V" shaped monohull chassis that directs the force of the blast away from the occupants.

Buffalo is also now equipped with BAE Systems' LROD cage armor for additional protection against RPG-7 anti-tank rounds.
Glass armor is sufficient at 6 inches thickness. Run-flat tires are mounted on all six wheels.  The Buffalo combines ballistic and blast protection with infrared technology to detect the presence of dangerous ordnance and a robotic arm to disable the explosive ordnance. Personnel operate the Buffalo’s 30-foot robotic arm and claw from within the armored hull via a mounted camera and sensory equipment, to safely dispose of mines and IEDs.

In 2004, the United States had a limited number of Buffaloes in service, with an order for 15 more, at a cost of $10 million.  On June 6, 2008 Force Protection, Inc delivered its 200th Buffalo to the U.S. Military.

In 2009 Force Protection started producing the A2 version, with major changes in the Axle Tech rear axles, Cat C13 engine, Cat CX31 transmission, and suspension, along with additional upgrades to the HVAC system, hood and front bumper. The easiest way to identify an A1 version from the A2 version is that the front bumper of the A2 has a larger profile. The last Buffalo A2 MRAP truck 795 was completed in June 2014. Force Protection was acquired by General Dynamics Land Systems (GDLS) in 2011 for $350 million.

Variants
 Buffalo H
 Buffalo A2

Operators

  - 200 A1 version and approximately 450 A2 version
  - 5 plus an additional 10 for delivery in 2009. 19 in service in Afghanistan. Canada ended its mission in Afghanistan in 2011 and is no longer in use in Afghanistan.
  - 5 vehicles
 
: 20 Cougar JERRV (Buffalo Explosive Ordnance Disposal version) received from US under Coalition Support Fund in 2010.
  - 18 vehicles

Notable appearances in media
The Buffalo appeared as the vehicle mode of the Decepticon Bonecrusher in the movie Transformers (2007), and in the sequel, Transformers: Revenge of the Fallen. Production designer Jeff Mann stated, "We found this image of a mine-sweeping vehicle that had a huge arm with what appeared to be a fork on the end.

Buffalo vehicles and JERRVs are used by the Navy Explosive Ordnance Disposal (EOD) team in the television show "Bomb Patrol Afghanistan".

See also
 MRAP (armored vehicle)
 Buffel
 Casspir
 Kamaz Typhoon
 Ural Typhoon
 Wer’wolf MKII
 RG-33

Gallery

References

External links
Buffalo series ForceProtection.net
Buffalo MPCV EOD Technical Data Sheet and Pictures Army Recognition

Armored personnel carriers of the United States
Military engineering vehicles of the United States
Military vehicles introduced in the 2000s